The Stan Getz Quartet in Paris is a live album by saxophonist Stan Getz recorded at the Salle Pleyel which was first released on the French Verve label.

Reception

The AllMusic review by Ken Dryden stated "The tenor saxophonist's always-lush tone is beautifully complemented by his musicians' sensitive accompaniment".

Track listing

There are several editions of this album. Here are all the tracks included in at least one of them.

 "Manhã de Carnaval" (Luiz Bonfá, Antônio Maria) - 3:26  	
 "When the World Was Young" (Philippe-Gérard, Angèle Vannier, Johnny Mercer) - 6:09
 "Singing Song" (Gary Burton) - 3:10
 "Sweet Rain" (Mike Gibbs) - 7:30
 "On Green Dolphin Street" (Bronisław Kaper, Ned Washington) - 5:52
 "O Grande Amor" (Antônio Carlos Jobim, Vinicius de Moraes) - 5:25
 "Stan's Blues" (Stan Getz, Gigi Gryce) - 5:53 	
 "Edelweiss" (Richard Rodgers, Oscar Hammerstein II) - 3:56 	
 "The Knight Rides Again" (Frank Loesser) - 10:10

Personnel 
Stan Getz - tenor saxophone
Gary Burton - vibraphone
Steve Swallow - bass
Roy Haynes - drums

References 

1967 live albums
Stan Getz live albums
Verve Records live albums